Mariusz Liberda (born 24 December 1976 in Żary) is a former Polish footballer (goalkeeper). Liberda has made three appearances for the Poland national football team.

Since retiring from playing, Liberda has been a goalkeeping coach at several clubs in Poland.  In 2021, he was appointed as goalkeeping coach at Dawn NDM.

References

External links
 
 

1976 births
Living people
People from Żary
Polish footballers
Poland international footballers
Association football goalkeepers
Promień Żary players
Polonia Warsaw players
Zagłębie Lubin players
Dyskobolia Grodzisk Wielkopolski players
Ekstraklasa players
Livingston F.C. players
Polish expatriate footballers
Expatriate footballers in Scotland
Polish expatriate sportspeople in Scotland
Scottish Football League players
Sportspeople from Lubusz Voivodeship